Tavusiyeh (also Romanized as Ţāvūsīyeh; also known as Shahrak-e Ţāvūsīyeh) is a village in Ramjin Rural District, Chaharbagh District, Savojbolagh County, Alborz Province, Iran. At the 2006 census, its population was 594, in 171 families.

References 

Populated places in Savojbolagh County